|}

The Fairyhouse Easter Festival Novice Hurdle, currently run as the Colm Quinn BMW Novice Hurdle, is a Grade 2 National Hunt hurdle race in Ireland which is open to horses aged four years or older. 
It is run at Fairyhouse over a distance of 2 miles and 4 furlongs (4,023 metres), and it is scheduled to take place each year in April. The race is usually run at the course's Easter Festival but in 2017 it was moved to a fixture in early April to avoid clashing with similar races at the Punchestown Festival.

The race was awarded Grade 2 status in 2004.

Records
Leading jockey since 1992 (4 wins):
 Paul Carberry –  Winter Garden (1999), Boley Lad (2000), Thari (2002), Aitmatov (2007) 

Leading trainer since 1992  (6 wins):
 Willie Mullins -  Sadlers Wings (2004), Cooldine (2008), Lambro (2011), Shaneshill (2015), Al Boum Photo (2017), Bronn (2022)

Winners

See also
 Horse racing in Ireland
 List of Irish National Hunt races

References

Racing Post:

National Hunt races in Ireland
National Hunt hurdle races
Fairyhouse Racecourse